Cornwell Inn, also known as Cornwell's, is a historic inn located near Blackstock, Chester County, South Carolina.  The original portion was built about 1841, and is a 1 1/2 story, five bay, heavy-timber frame and weatherboard Federal style building, with a double pitched gable roof.  It has two exterior end chimneys with free-standing chimney stacks and ten-foot deep, full length porches on two sides.  A 1 1/2-story, five bay addition with a full basement was added shortly after the original construction.  It is one of South Carolina's surviving early stagecoach stops on a main state road, the Charlotte to Charleston Road.

It was listed on the National Register of Historic Places in 1994.

References

Hotel buildings on the National Register of Historic Places in South Carolina
Hotel buildings completed in 1841
Federal architecture in South Carolina
Buildings and structures in Chester County, South Carolina
National Register of Historic Places in Chester County, South Carolina